Charles Shelford  (20 August 1920 – 7 May 1984) was a notable New Zealand  labourer, soldier and drainlayer. Of Māori descent, he identified with the Ngati Porou and Te Whakatohea iwi. He was born in Te Kaha, Bay of Plenty, New Zealand in 1920.

References

1920 births
1984 deaths
New Zealand military personnel of World War II
New Zealand Māori soldiers
Whakatōhea people
Ngāti Porou people
People from Te Kaha
New Zealand recipients of the Distinguished Conduct Medal